The Portal Bridge is a two-track moveable swing-span railroad bridge over the Hackensack River in Kearny and Secaucus, New Jersey, United States. It is on the Northeast Corridor just west of Secaucus Junction and east of the Sawtooth Bridges. Owned and operated by Amtrak, and used extensively by NJ Transit, it is the busiest train span in the Western Hemisphere, carrying between 150,000 and 200,000 passengers per day on approximately 450 daily trains (an average of one train every six minutes over a 24-hour period).

Originally opened in 1910, the bridge was built by the Pennsylvania Railroad in conjunction with service to the newly constructed Pennsylvania Station in New York City. The bridge clearance of  requires it to swing open to allow even small commercial boats to pass underneath it.

Replacement of the bridge is the first phase of the Gateway Project. After initially refusing to provide any funding for the project, the Trump administration allowed the project to move forward in February 2020. The project is estimated to cost $1.8 billion. Funding comprises $811 million from the State of New Jersey, $766.5 million from the Federal Transit Administration (FTA), $261.5 million from Amtrak and $57.1 million from the Federal Highway Administration (FHWA). Construction of the new bridge was given final approval to proceed in April 2022 and later began on August 1, 2022. The first track on the new bridge is scheduled to be operational in November 2025.

Design and construction
The bridge was built by the Pennsylvania Railroad as part of its New York Tunnel Extension project, which also included the Sawtooth Bridges, North River Tunnels, and Manhattan Transfer station.

The Portal Bridge is a  steel structure with masonry abutments. The bridge consists of a  through-truss swing span and six  open-deck girder approach spans (three on each side of the center span). The bridge itself is partially made of wood.

Construction of the bridge was begun in August 1905, and the bridge was placed in service on November 27, 1910, based on bridge designs from the 1840s. The bridge was designed to last 100 years. Overhead catenary to supply power to electric locomotives was installed in the 1930s.

Some of the bridge machinery was updated in 1931. Minor repairs were made in the 1970s, and major repairs to structural, mechanical and electrical equipment were completed as part of Amtrak's Northeast Corridor Improvement Project between 1982 and 1984. Timbers were replaced in 2019.

Operation

Rail service
Rail traffic is carried over the swing bridge when it is closed. Rail service is currently at capacity, having grown from 40,000 daily passengers in 2005 to 150,000 to 200,000 daily passengers in 2015 on approximately 450 daily trains for Amtrak and New Jersey Transit.

, Amtrak operated some 293 scheduled trains a week in both directions (about 42 per day) over this segment of the Northeast Corridor between Newark Penn Station and New York Penn Station. Five NJ Transit rail lines (Northeast Corridor Line, North Jersey Coast Line, Morris and Essex Lines, Montclair-Boonton Line, and Raritan Valley Line) with 388 trains use the bridge each weekday in both directions.

River traffic
River traffic along the Hackensack River can flow under the swing bridge when it is open. Schedules prohibit the Portal Bridge from opening weekdays 5 am to 10 am and 3 pm to 8 pm, during peak commuter travel periods over the bridge. At other times, the bridge opens on signal if a vessel gives two-hour notice, also in the hours leading up to peak periods, which can affect train schedules.

When closed to river traffic, the bridge bears upon six wedge blocks. Two blocks are at each end of the bridge while two more sit adjacent to the center of the bridge. After the wedges are withdrawn the center-bearing supports the structure as the bridge is opened and returns it to its closed position once the river traffic has passed through one or both of the navigation channels.

, the only regularly scheduled commercial traffic on the river was a barge transporting sludge from the Bergen County Utilities Authority sewage treatment plant in Little Ferry to the Passaic Valley Sewerage Commission plant in Newark. For the last four months of 2014, of the 90 times the bridge was opened, 75 were to provide service to the sludge barge. The bridge has caused numerous delays in train service in order to allow for river service, though Amtrak does not keep specific records of delays. All sludge had been trucked since 2016. In 2021, it was announced that the sludge barges would resume.

Operational issues
The Portal Bridge has been called the Achilles' heel of the Northeast Corridor for several reasons. As a result, the bridge often has to be opened to allow commercial boats to pass underneath it, which causes more delays for both train and boat traffic.

The Portal Bridge fails to close properly one out of seven times it opens, because the rails can fail to lock into place. In extreme cases, rail crews must bang the rails into place with sledgehammers before trains can cross. One report in 2019 estimated that the North River Tubes and the Portal Bridge contributed to 2,000 hours of delays between 2014 and 2018.

Accidents and incidents

1996 derailment
The bridge was site of a derailment on November 23, 1996 when the swing bridge failed to close properly. Amtrak's northbound  train #12, with twelve passenger and mail coaches pulled by two locomotives on a Washington-to-Boston run with 88 passengers and 20 crew members, derailed as it reached the bridge. It sideswiped the southbound , but continued across the bridge, prevented from plunging through the trestles into the river by guide rails that parallel the main tracks. Then its twin locomotives, a baggage car, and three passenger coaches plunged over an embankment.

There were no deaths. Thirty-four people were hospitalized. The reason for the derailment was that a rail was 5 inches higher than it was supposed to be, and acted as a ramp. The cost of the derailment was estimated at $3.6 million.

Fires
On May 13, 2005, the bridge caught on fire. NJ Transit engineers believe that the 13kV overhead electrical wires overheated, sending shards of metal towards the creosote-covered wooden fenders at the base of the bridge. The immediate result of the fire was to block all traffic until the next morning. The cost of the incident was $5 million.

On August 4, 2014, the bridge caught on fire, interrupting rail traffic for half an hour.

Replacement

Planning 
The bridge requires millions of dollars of yearly maintenance. According to several officials, the bridge is considered a "choke-point" which reduces the potential speed and capacity of the line. These officials include U.S. Sen. Bob Menendez (NJ); Drew Galloway, Amtrak Assistant V.P. of Planning and Development and the chief of Planning and Performance for the Northeast Corridor; New Jersey Transit Executive Director Richard Sarles.

In December 2008, the Federal Railroad Administration approved a $1.34 billion project to replace the Portal Bridge with two new bridges: a three-track bridge to the north, and a two-track bridge to the south. The new bridges were then scheduled to be completed in 2017, at which time the Portal Bridge was to be dismantled. In course of design work the number of tracks on the north bridge has been reduced from three to two.

Design work progressed in 2009 and 2010. In 2009, New Jersey applied for $38.5 million in funding for the replacement from the American Recovery and Reinvestment Act of 2009. On January 28, 2010, the federal funds were released as a TIGER grant as part of a larger package of $112 million for the entire Northeast Corridor. The $38.5 million in federal funds were intended for final design for the new bridge.

The original timeline for the project called for construction of the new bridge to begin in 2010, with the bridge replacement to be complete by 2017. Due to cancellation of the Access to the Region's Core project by New Jersey governor Chris Christie in 2010, as well to as funding issues, this original plan was reduced to a single two-track bridge constructed north of the current bridge with room for a new bridge south of the current bridge left open to follow.

In 2014, design work for the new Portal Bridge North had been completed. The new bridge would be a part of the Amtrak Gateway Project—itself a partial replacement of the Access to the Region's Core—estimated to cost $13.5 billion.

Preliminary site-preparation work for one span, Portal Bridge North, began in October 2017 and was expected to be complete in 2019.

Delays 
Progress on the Portal Bridge North had stalled due to lack of funding. In April 2011, Amtrak applied for federal funding of $570 million for construction, with New Jersey expected to commit $150 million. , however, the project was lacking $940 million in funding. The Port Authority of New York and New Jersey planned to contribute $300 million to the project.

Funding 
In October 2015, a $16 million TIGER grant was awarded for use to support early construction activities such as realignment of a 138kV transmission monopole, constructing a temporary fiber optic cable pole line, building a finger pier construction access structure, a service access road and a 560-foot retaining wall. The work was completed in February 2019.

, the expected schedule was for engineering phase to begin in 2017 and revenue service to start in 2024. In May 2017, NJ Transit awarded a contract to carry out this work. In June 2017, the Gateway Development Corporation formally applied for federal funding for the project. The Federal Transit Administration (FTA) approved the Environmental Impact Statement for the replacement bridge in August 2017. Construction on the first of two replacement bridges began in October 2017. Amtrak has estimated the cost of the bridge's replacement to be $1.5 billion.

Jersey City, which owns a  parcel originally earmarked for preservation and recreation, will sell it to make way for construction of the bridge.

In June 2018, the State of New Jersey approved $600 million in bonds to finance the project. Despite state funding, the federal government withheld funds for the project. On June 24, 2019, the state governments of New York and New Jersey passed legislation to create the bi-state Gateway Development Commission, whose job it is to oversee the planning, funding, and construction of the rail tunnels and bridges of Gateway Program. In September 2019, NJ Transit submitted a revised plan to the federal government clarifying the "local" contribution, which includes funding from Pennsylvania, New Jersey, New York, and Amtrak.

On February 10, 2020, the replacement project was upgraded to "medium-high" priority by the FTA, thereby becoming eligible for funding under the Capital Investment Grants Program. Despite his skepticism of the Gateway Program, President Donald Trump signaled that he would not stand in the way of the Portal Bridge Replacement Project after dinner with New Jersey Governor Phil Murphy. In early July 2020, the FTA approved $767 million in funding for the project. In late May, Amtrak received $55 million from the same agency for the replacement bridge.

Construction
On October 12, 2021, the NJ Transit board awarded a $1.56 billion construction contract for the new bridge. The first track on the new bridge will be operational in November 2025. The second track will be operational in July 2026, with the project completed in 2027. Construction of the new bridge was given final approval to proceed in April 2022. After multiple delays, construction on the new bridge began on August 1, 2022.

See also
 
 List of crossings of the Hackensack River
 Sawtooth Bridges
 List of bridges, tunnels, and cuts in Hudson County, New Jersey
 List of NJ Transit movable bridges

References

External links

 Amtrak - Portal North Bridge Project
 "The Portal Bridge Link" - Enhancement project newsletter, January 2007
 NTSB Special Investigation Report regarding 1997 derailment
 Movable Railroad Bridges of New Jersey-photo catalog
 Record of Decision (2008) - Federal Railroad Administration

Amtrak bridges
Bridges completed in 1910
Bridges over the Hackensack River
NJ Transit bridges
Pennsylvania Railroad bridges
Railroad bridges in New Jersey
Swing bridges in the United States
Bridges in Hudson County, New Jersey
Steel bridges in the United States
Pratt truss bridges in the United States
Kearny, New Jersey
Secaucus, New Jersey